Merthyr Tydfil Golf Club (also known as Cilsanws Golf Course; Welsh: Clwb Golff Merthyr Tydfil (Cilsanws)) is a golf club based just outside Merthyr Tydfil at Merthyr Tydfil County Borough, Wales. Also known by the name "Cilsanws", this is an 18-hole mountain course. Their "Pay and Play" course  is available to non-members.

Notes
Official Site
mtgc.co.uk

Sport in Merthyr Tydfil
Golf clubs and courses in Wales